Obstacles to troop movement represent either natural, human habitat originated, constructed, concealed obstacles, or obstructive impediments to movement of military troops and their vehicles, or to their visibility. By impeding strategic, operational or tactical manoeuvre, the obstacle represents an added barrier between opposing combat forces, and therefore prevent achievement of objectives and goals specified in the operational planning schedule. The constructed obstacles are used as an aid to defending a position or area as part of the general defensive plan of the commander. The obstacles that originate from the human habitat can be converted by troops into constructed obstacles by either performing additional construction, or executing demolitions to obstruct movement over the transport network, to create a choke point, or to deny traversing of an area to the enemy. The natural obstacles can be used defensively by securing a more difficult to breach defensive position by for example securing a flank on terrain that is deemed impossible to traverse, thus denying the enemy an ability to close into combat range of direct fire weapons.

Role of obstacles

Obstacles are used in combat operations to create choke points, deny mobility corridors and avenue of approach to positions, to enhance field of fire for direct fire weapons, or to protect key tactical terrain features to the enemy.

Types of obstacles

Natural obstacles

Natural obstacles are represented by those terrain features that for which few troops and their vehicles have capability to traverse. They include water obstacles, or areas of poor drainage such as lakes, rivers, swamps and marshes. The former two can be crossed by amphibious vehicles capable of swimming, or vehicles capable of deep wading after preparation, or by constructing a water crossing, and thus creating an easily targeted choke point. Soil and rock can also represent mobility obstacles if the soil is too soft and unable to support the weight of the military vehicles, or the terrain is fractured by cliffs, or large boulders that make organised movement impossible. While soft soil is relative to vehicle ground pressure, there is little that can be done to negotiate very rocky terrain or cliffs except by using specially trained light infantry troops. Vegetation such as jungles or dense forests can also represent obstacles to movement, in some cases even to light infantry troops. Some natural obstacles can be a result of climatic or soil activity such as deep snow that by covering all terrain makes safe traversing difficult and slow, or landslides that may create an obstruction suddenly despite previously clear route reconnaissance report.

Habitat obstacles

While human habitat had, since early construction of roads, sought to create ways of negotiating terrain faster, the human activity on the landscape can create obstacles in its own right. Artificial lakes and ponds, canals, and areas of agricultural cultivation, particularly those that are water-intensive such as rice-paddy fields create obstacles often more difficult than the natural equivalents. Mining activity creates quarries, and the building of roads, rail roads and dams also involve construction of cuts and fills. Seeded tree-line windbreaks, hedgerows, stone walls and plantation forests also disrupt mobility, particularly of vehicles. Lastly the urban areas in themselves represent obstacles by offering elevated firing positions and canyon-like choke points by forcing the opponent to advance through the streets.

Constructed obstacles

Constructed obstacles are those prepared by military engineering troops, often combat engineers, by either using materials to construct impediments to foot and vehicle-borne troops, or by using demolition methods, or excavation such as an abatis, to create obstacles from natural materials and terrain in specific location in accordance with the overall plan of operations. Sometimes such obstacles can be created intentionally or unintentionally through effects of artillery fire cratering. Buildings demolished due to combat or aerial bombing become very effective obstacles as rubble represents difficult to negotiate and irregular piles of building materials.

Concealed obstacles

Concealed obstacles are used with the intention of not only preventing movement of enemy troops, but also causing casualties during attempted movement. Although one of the oldest forms of obstacle use, this became far deadlier with the invention of the mine warfare, and more so with air-delivered scattered submunition minelets that can create an instant minefield.

Obstructive obstacles

Obstructive obstacles are used primarily to deny terrain visibility to the enemy, thus creating uncertainty in targeting friendly troops. Although ancient in use as tar smoke pots, modern smoke screens are temporary and are used as a tactical measure during manoeuvring, often when a unit is performing a position change.

Obstacle negotiation

Ground troops prefer to deal with physical obstacles by circumventing them as rapidly as possible, thus avoiding becoming stationary targets to the enemy direct and indirect fire weapons, and aircraft. Where this is not possible, in modern warfare the most expedient measures taken against constructed or urban obstacles are to either use armoured vehicles, preferably tanks, to remove the obstacle, or to demolish them by firing High Explosive munitions at them. Where combat engineers are present, they can perform this using their specialist skills and tools or vehicles. In the case of natural obstacles, specialist engineering equipment is usually required to negotiate the obstacle, commonly bridging or pontoons. The solution to obstacle bridging had at the strategic level created new forms of warfare and employment of troops in the amphibious operations, and later the airborne operations. At the operational level the use of helicopters in airmobile operations offers a vertical option to negotiating obstacles, often of considerable extent such as mountain passes or extensive areas of impossible vegetation.

See also
 Engineer reconnaissance
 Route reconnaissance
 Military tactics
 Types of military tactics
 Types of military operations
 Types of military strategies

References

Citations

Bibliography
 Liddell Hart, Basil Henry, The Tanks: The history of the Royal Tank Regiment and its predecessors, Heavy Branch, Machine-Gun Corps, Tank Corps, and Royal Tank Corps, 1914-1945, Cassell, London, 1959 

Land warfare
Military engineering